"Take Your Time (Do It Right)" is the debut single by the S.O.S. Band. It was released on March 18, 1980 as the lead single from the debut album S.O.S. through Tabu Records, three months before the album's release.

Chart performance
In the United States, it reached the number-one spot on the Billboard R&B singles chart and number three on the Billboard Hot 100 in mid-1980. On the Billboard dance chart, it went to number one for four non-consecutive weeks. The single was certified platinum by the RIAA for sales of one million copies. It spent five months (21 weeks) on the US charts. "Take Your Time (Do It Right)" was a worldwide hit; however, only in New Zealand did its popularity match that of the US, peaking there likewise at number three. It was moderately successful elsewhere, reaching number 40 in Australia, number 27 in Canada and number 10 in Norway. In the UK it missed the top 40 entirely, peaking at number 51. It is ranked as the 36th biggest American hit of 1980, and the 42nd in New Zealand.

Charts

Weekly charts

Year-end charts

Max-A-Million recording
In 1995, Max-A-Million recorded the song which peaked in the top 20 on the US dance club play chart and also charted on the Hot 100. The song was the title track to their Take Your Time LP.

Charts

See also
 List of 1980s one-hit wonders in the United States
 List of Cash Box Top 100 number-one singles of 1980
List of number-one R&B singles of 1980 (U.S.)

References

External links
 Lyrics of this song
[ Song review] from AllMusic
 

1980 songs
1980 debut singles
1995 singles
The S.O.S. Band songs
Cashbox number-one singles
Tabu Records singles